In the mathematical fields of differential geometry and geometric analysis, the Calabi flow is a geometric flow which deforms a Kähler metric on a complex manifold. Precisely, given a Kähler manifold , the Calabi flow is given by:
,

The Calabi flow was introduced by Eugenio Calabi in 1982 as a suggestion for the construction of extremal Kähler metrics, which were also introduced in the same paper.

A convergence theorem for the Calabi flow was found by Piotr Chruściel in the case that  has complex dimension equal to one. Xiuxiong Chen and others have made a number of further studies of the flow, although as of 2020 the flow is still not well understood.

References
 Eugenio Calabi. Extremal Kähler metrics. Ann. of Math. Stud. 102 (1982), pp. 259–290. Seminar on Differential Geometry. Princeton University Press (PUP), Princeton, N.J.
 E. Calabi and X.X. Chen. The space of Kähler metrics. II. J. Differential Geom. 61 (2002), no. 2, 173–193.
 X.X. Chen and W.Y. He. On the Calabi flow. Amer. J. Math. 130 (2008), no. 2, 539–570.
 Piotr T. Chruściel. Semi-global existence and convergence of solutions of the Robinson-Trautman (2-dimensional Calabi) equation. Comm. Math. Phys. 137 (1991), no. 2, 289–313.

Geometric flow
Partial differential equations
String theory